Stefania Grodzieńska (2 September 1914 – 28 April 2010) was a Polish writer, stage and theatrical actress during the Interbellum; dancer, radio announcer, and satirist known as the First Lady of Polish Humor.

Biography
Grodzieńska was born in Łódź to a family of a university professor during the final years of the Russian imperial possession. She spent some of her childhood in Moscow, and attended a ballet school in Berlin. She married for the first time at the age of 18 and moved to Warsaw in 1933. She worked in Cyganeria Theatre, and danced in Teatr Kameralny (Intimate Theatre). Soon, dir. Fryderyk Jarosy brought her into the staff of Cyrulik Warszawski, a Polish satirical theatre. Grodzieńska met there her second husband, writer Jerzy Jurandot whom she married in 1938. During the Nazi German occupation of Poland they lived in the Warsaw Ghetto, but escaped before the murderous Grossaktion Warsaw of 1942.

After World War II she started writing feuilletons for the Polish satirical magazine Szpilki, she also wrote many monologues and sketches. Her essays were performed by Hanka Bielicka, Adolf Dymsza, Loda Halama, Alina Janowska, Kalina Jędrusik, Bogumił Kobiela, Irena Kwiatkowska and others. For several years Stefania Grodzieńska was working in Polskie Radio, and then for a couple of years in the entertainment section of Telewizja Polska.

She was the wife of Jerzy Jurandot, a poet, dramatist, satirist and songwriter. She died after a short illness on 28 April 2010, aged 95, in Skolimów.

Writings
She authored several sets of feuilletons: Dzionek satyryka, Jestem niepoważna, Brzydki ogród, 
Felietony i humoreski, Plagi i plażki, Rozmówki, and Kłania się PRL. She also wrote the novel, Wspomnienia chałturzystki as well as several biographies and memoirs.

Prizes and distinctions

 Diamentowy Mikrofon (Diamond Microphone)
 Hiacynt (Hyacinth)
  Commander's Cross of the Polonia Restituta
  Gold Medal for Merit to Culture – Gloria Artis

References

External links

 

1914 births
2010 deaths
Polish stage actresses
Polish cabaret performers
Polish ballerinas
20th-century Polish Jews
Polish publicists
Polish satirists
Actors from Łódź
Commanders of the Order of Polonia Restituta
Recipients of the Gold Medal for Merit to Culture – Gloria Artis
Polish radio personalities
Women satirists
20th-century Polish actresses
Entertainers from Łódź
20th-century Polish ballet dancers